Tarek Momen (born 23 February 1988 in Cairo) is a professional squash player representing Egypt. He is a former World Champion, and reached a career-high world ranking of World No. 3 in February 2019.

Career overview
A PSA member since 2005, Tarek Momen found time to graduate in Electronic Engineering at the American University in Cairo before devoting himself 100% to the Tour – and first breaking into the top 20 world rankings in August 2010, then celebrating a career-high No10 in April 2013.

The latest Egyptian to break into the world top ten, Momen reached his first Tour final at the Thessaloniki Open in Greece in March 2006 as a qualifier – upsetting No2 seed Daryl Selby in the semi-finals before losing out to Spanish favourite Borja Golán in the final.
It was five years later before he converted a final appearance into a winner's cheque – claiming his maiden title at the 2011 Irish Open in Dublin. Unseeded, Momen dismissed No2 seed Olli Tuominen, then third seed Saurav Ghosal before overcoming Australian favourite Stewart Boswell 12-10, 11-7, 8-11, 11-3 in the final.

And later in 2012, two significant titles came Momen's way: Firstly, seeded three in the Colombian Open, he ousted local hero Miguel Ángel Rodríguez in the final to win the PSA International 35 title in Bogota – then, unseeded, he carved his way through the Malaysian Open field in Selangor, dismissing Borja Golán in four games in the semi-finals before overcoming fellow countryman Mohamed El Shorbagy, the event's second seed, 12-10, 6-11, 12-10, 8-11, 14-12 in the 109-minute final.
The PSA International 50 title marked the third and biggest of his career.

The Selangor success had extra significance for Momen as the women's title was won by compatriot Raneem El Weleily, the then world No2 who later became his wife.
Momen's 2013 campaign began strongly with a surprise semi-final finish in the Swedish Open after a five-game upset over 4th seed Daryl Selby in the opening round. 
Last 16 round finishes in successive World Series events, the North American Open and PSA Kuwait Cup in March – coupled with a quarter-final berth in the KL Open, where he was unseeded – all led to his career-high No.10 ranking the following month.
And the British Open in May saw the 25-year-old record his best ever performance in the event when he upset seventh seed Peter Barker to reach the quarter-finals.

Away from the Tour, Momen made his senior debut for Egypt in the World Team Championship in June in France, where he won all but one of his matches for the title-holders.

Personal life 
Tarek is married to Raneem El Weleily, an Egyptian professional squash. 

He also has a bachelor's degree in engineering from the American University in Cairo.

On 2 January 2021, Momen and El Weleily welcomed their first child, a boy named Shahir.

References

External links 
 
 
 

1988 births
Living people
Egyptian male squash players
21st-century Egyptian people